Bison are large bovines in the genus Bison (Greek: "wild ox" (bison)) within the tribe Bovini. Two extant and numerous extinct species are recognised.

Of the two surviving species, the American bison, B. bison, found only in North America, is the more numerous. Although colloquially referred to as a buffalo in the United States and Canada, it is only distantly related to the true buffalo. The North American species is composed of two subspecies, the Plains bison, B. b. bison, and the wood bison, B. b. athabascae, which is the namesake of Wood Buffalo National Park in Canada. A third subspecies, the eastern bison (B. b. pennsylvanicus) is no longer considered a valid taxon, being a junior synonym of B. b. bison. References to "woods bison" or "wood bison" from the eastern United States refer to this subspecies, not B. b. athabascae, which was not found in the region. The European bison, B. bonasus, or wisent, or zubr, or colloquially European buffalo, is found in Europe and the Caucasus, reintroduced after being extinct in the wild.

While bison species have been traditionally classified in their own genus, modern genetics indicates that they are nested within the genus Bos, which includes, among others, cattle, yaks and gaur, being most closely related to yaks. Bison are sometimes bred with domestic cattle and produce offspring called beefalo or zubron.

Description

The American bison and the European bison (wisent) are the largest surviving terrestrial animals in North America and Europe. They are typical artiodactyl (cloven hooved) ungulates, and are similar in appearance to other bovines such as cattle and true buffalo. They are broad and muscular with shaggy coats of long hair. European bison tend to be taller than American bison.

Bison are nomadic grazers and travel in herds. The bulls leave the herds of females at two or three years of age, and join a herd of males, which are generally smaller than female herds. Mature bulls rarely travel alone. Towards the end of the summer, for the reproductive season, the sexes necessarily commingle.

American bison are known for living in the Great Plains, but formerly had a much larger range, including much of the eastern United States and parts of Mexico. Both species were hunted close to extinction during the 19th and 20th centuries, but have since rebounded. The wisent in part owes its survival to the Chernobyl disaster, as the Chernobyl Exclusion Zone has become a kind of wildlife preserve for wisent and other rare megafauna such as the Przewalski's horse, though poaching has become a threat in recent years. The American Plains bison is no longer listed as endangered, but this does not mean the species is secure. Genetically pure B. b. bison currently number only about 20,000, separated into fragmented herds—all of which require active conservation measures. The wood bison is on the endangered species list in Canada and is listed as threatened in the United States, though numerous attempts have been made by beefalo ranchers to have it entirely removed from the Endangered Species List.

Although superficially similar, physical and behavioural differences exist between the American and European bison. The American species has 15 ribs, while the European bison has 14. The American bison has four lumbar vertebrae, while the European has five. (The difference in this case is that what would be the first lumbar vertebra has ribs attached to it in American bison and is thus counted as the 15th thoracic vertebra, compared to 14 thoracic vertebrae in wisent.) Adult American bison are less slim in build and have shorter legs. American bison tend to graze more, and browse less than their European relatives. Their anatomies reflect this behavioural difference; the American bison's head hangs lower than the European's. The body of the American bison is typically hairier, though its tail has less hair than that of the European bison. The horns of the European bison point through the plane of their faces, making them more adept at fighting through the interlocking of horns in the same manner as domestic cattle, unlike the American bison, which favours butting. American bison are more easily tamed than their European cousins, and breed with domestic cattle more readily.

Evolution and genetic history
The bovine tribe (Bovini) split about 5 to 10 million years ago into the buffalos (Bubalus and Syncerus) and a group leading to bison and taurine cattle. Genetic evidence from nuclear DNA indicates that the closest living relatives of bison are yaks, with bison being nested within the genus Bos, rendering Bos without including bison paraphyletic. While nuclear DNA indicates that both extant bison species are each others closest living relatives, the mitochondrial DNA of European bison is more closely related to that of domestic cattle and aurochs (while the mitochondrial DNA of American bison is closely related to that of yaks). This discrepancy is either suggested to be the result of incomplete lineage sorting or ancient introgression. Bison are widely believed to have evolved from a lineage belonging to the extinct genus Leptobos during the Late Pliocene to Early Pleistocene in Asia. The earliest members of the bison lineage, known from the Late Pliocene to Early Pleistocene of the Indian Subcontinent (Bison sivalensis) and China (Bison palaeosinensis), approximately 3.4-2.6 million years ago (Ma) are placed in the subgenus Bison (Eobison). The oldest remains of Eobison in Europe are those Bison georgicus found in Dmanisi, Georgia, dated to around 1.76 Ma. More derived members of the genus are placed in the subgenus Bison (Bison), which first appeared towards the end of the Early Pleistocene, around 1.2 Ma, with early members of the subgenus including the widespread Bison schoetensacki.

The steppe bison (Bison priscus) first appeared during the mid-Middle Pleistocene in eastern Eurasia, and subsequently became widely distributed across Eurasia. During the late Middle Pleistocene, around 195,000-135,000 years ago, the steppe bison migrated across the Bering land bridge into North America, becoming ancestral to modern American bison, as well as extinct forms such as the largest known bison, the long-horned Bison latifrons, and the smaller Bison antiquus, which became extinct at the end of the Late Pleistocene. Modern American bison are thought to have evolved from B. antiquus during the Late Pleistocene-Holocene transition via the intermediate form Bison occidentalis. The European bison, Bison bonasus, first appeared in Europe during the late Middle Pleistocene, where it existed in sympatry with the steppe bison. Its relationship with other extinct bison species is unclear, though it appears to be only distantly related to the steppe and American bisons, with possibly some interbreeding between the two lineages during the Middle Pleistocene. The steppe bison survived into the early-mid Holocene in Alaska-Yukon and eastern Siberia, before becoming extinct.

During the population bottleneck caused by the great slaughter of American bison during the 19th century, the number of bison remaining alive in North America declined to as low as 541. During that period, a handful of ranchers gathered remnants of the existing herds to save the species from extinction. These ranchers bred some of the bison with cattle in an effort to produce "cattleo" (today called "beefalo") Accidental crossings were also known to occur. Generally, male domestic bulls were crossed with bison cows, producing offspring of which only the females were fertile. The crossbred animals did not demonstrate any form of hybrid vigor, so the practice was abandoned. Wisent-American bison hybrids were briefly experimented with in Germany (and found to be fully fertile) and a herd of such animals is maintained in Russia. A herd of cattle-wisent crossbreeds (zubron) is maintained in Poland. First-generation crosses do not occur naturally, requiring caesarean delivery. First-generation males are infertile. The U.S. National Bison Association has adopted a code of ethics that prohibits its members from deliberately crossbreeding bison with any other species. In the United States, many ranchers are now using DNA testing to cull the residual cattle genetics from their bison herds. The proportion of cattle DNA that has been measured in introgressed individuals and bison herds today is typically quite low, ranging from 0.56 to 1.8%.

There are also remnant purebred American bison herds on public lands in North America. Herds of importance are found in Yellowstone National Park, Wind Cave National Park in South Dakota, Blue Mounds State Park in Minnesota, Elk Island National Park in Alberta, and Grasslands National Park in Saskatchewan. In 2015, a purebred herd of 350 individuals was identified on public lands in the Henry Mountains of southern Utah via genetic testing of mitochondrial and nuclear DNA. This study, published in 2015, also showed the Henry Mountains bison herd to be free of brucellosis, a bacterial disease that was imported with non-native domestic cattle to North America.

In 2021, the American Society of Mammalogists considered Bison to be a subgenus, and placed both bison species back into Bos.

Behavior

Wallowing is a common behavior of bison. A bison wallow is a shallow depression in the soil, either wet or dry. Bison roll in these depressions, covering themselves with mud or dust. Possible explanations suggested for wallowing behavior include grooming behavior associated with moulting, male-male interaction (typically rutting behavior), social behavior for group cohesion, play behavior, relief from skin irritation due to biting insects, reduction of ectoparasite load (ticks and lice), and thermoregulation. In the process of wallowing, bison may become infected by the fatal disease anthrax, which may occur naturally in the soil.

Bison temperament is often unpredictable. They usually appear peaceful, unconcerned, even lazy, yet they may attack anything, often without warning or apparent reason.

The hind legs can also be used to kill or maim with devastating effect. In the words of early naturalists, they were dangerous, savage animals that feared no other animal and in prime condition could best any foe (except for wolves and brown bears).

The rutting, or mating, season lasts from June through September, with peak activity in July and August. At this time, the older bulls rejoin the herd, and fights often take place between bulls. The herd exhibits much restlessness during breeding season. The animals are belligerent, unpredictable, and most dangerous.

Habitat

American bison live in river valleys and on prairies and plains. Typical habitat is open or semiopen grasslands, as well as sagebrush, semiarid lands, and scrublands. Some lightly wooded areas are also known historically to have supported bison. They also graze in hilly or mountainous areas where the slopes are not steep. Although not particularly known as high-altitude animals, bison in the Yellowstone Park bison herd are frequently found at elevations above .

European bison most commonly live in lightly wooded to fully wooded areas as well as areas with increased shrubs and bushes. European bison can sometimes be found living on grasslands and plains as well.

Restrictions
Throughout most of their historical range, landowners have sought restrictions on free-ranging bison. Herds on private land are required to be fenced in.

In the state of Montana, free-ranging bison on public lands may be shot, due to concerns about transmission of disease to cattle and damage to public property.

In 2013, Montana legislative measures concerning the bison were proposed and passed the legislature, but opposed by Native American tribes as they impinged on sovereign tribal rights. Three such bills were vetoed by Steve Bullock, the governor of Montana. The bison's circumstances remain an issue of contention between Native American tribes and private landowners.

Diet

Bison are ruminants, which gives them the ability to ferment plants in a specialized stomach prior to digesting them. Bison were once thought to almost exclusively consume grasses and sedges, but are now known to consume a wide-variety of plants including woody plants and herbaceous eudicots. Over the course of the year, bison shift which plants they select in their diet based on which plants have the highest protein or energy concentrations at a given time and will reliably consume the same species of plants across years. Protein concentrations of the plants they eat tend to be highest in the spring and decline thereafter, reaching their lowest in the winter. In Yellowstone National Park, bison browsed willows and cottonwoods, not only in the winter when few other plants are available, but also in the summer. Bison are thought to migrate to optimize their diet, and will concentrate their feeding on recently burned areas due to the higher quality forage that regrows after the burn. Wisent tend to browse on shrubs and low-hanging trees more often than do the American bison, which prefer grass to shrubbery and trees.

Reproduction 
Female bison typically do not reproduce until three years of age and can reproduce to at least 19 years of age. Female bison can produce calves annually as long as their nutrition is sufficient, but will not give birth to a calf after years where weight gain was too low. A mother's probability of reproduction the following year is strongly dependent on the mother's mass and age. Heavier female bison produce heavier calves (weighed in the fall at weaning) than light mothers, while the weight of calves is lower for older mothers (after age 8).

Predators

Owing to their size, bison have few predators. Five notable exceptions are humans, grey wolves, cougars, grizzly bears, and coyotes. Wolves generally take down a bison while in a pack, but cases of a single wolf killing bison have been reported. Grizzly bears also consume bison, often by driving off the pack and consuming the wolves' kill. Grizzly bears and coyotes also prey on bison calves. Historically and prehistorically, lions, cave lions, tigers, dire wolves, Smilodon, Homotherium, cave hyenas, and Neanderthals posed threats to bison.

Infections and illness
For the American bison, the main cause of illness is malignant catarrhal fever, though brucellosis is a serious concern in the Yellowstone Park bison herd. Bison in the Antelope Island bison herd are regularly inoculated against brucellosis, parasites, Clostridium infection, infectious bovine rhinotracheitis, and bovine vibriosis.

The major concerns for illness in European bison are foot-and-mouth disease and balanoposthitis, which affects the male sex organs; a number of parasitic diseases have also been cited as threats. The inbreeding of the species caused by the small population plays a role in a number of genetic defects and immunity to diseases, which in turn poses greater risks to the population.

Name
The term "buffalo" is sometimes considered to be a misnomer for this animal, as it is only distantly related to either of the two "true buffalo", the Asian water buffalo and the African buffalo. Samuel de Champlain applied the French term buffle to the bison in 1616 (published 1619), after seeing skins and a drawing shown to him by members of the Nipissing First Nation, who said they travelled 40 days (from east of Lake Huron) to trade with another nation who hunted the animals. Though "bison" might be considered more scientifically correct, "buffalo" is also considered correct as a result of standard usage in American English, and is listed in many dictionaries as an acceptable name for American buffalo or bison. Buffalo has a much longer history than bison, which was first recorded in 1774.

Human impact

Bison was a significant resource for indigenous peoples of North America for food and raw materials until near extinction in the late 19th century. For the indigenous peoples of the Plains, it was their principal food source. Native Americans highly valued their relationship with the bison and saw them as sacred, treating them respectfully to ensure their abundance and longevity. In his biography, Lakota teacher and elder John Fire Lame Deer describes the relationship as such:

European settlers were almost exclusively accountable for the near-extinction of the American bison in the 1800s. At the beginning of the century, tens of millions of bison roamed North America. Pioneers and settlers slaughtered an estimated 50 million bison during the 19th century, although the causes of decline and the numbers killed are disputed and debated. Railroads were advertising "hunting by rail", where trains encountered large herds alongside or crossing the tracks. Men aboard fired from the train's roof or windows, leaving countless animals to rot where they died. This overhunting was in part motivated by the U.S. government's desire to limit the range and power of indigenous plains Indians whose diets and cultures depended on the buffalo herds. The overhunting of the bison reduced their population to hundreds.

The American bison's nadir came in 1889, with an estimated population of only 1,091 animals (both wild and captive). Repopulation attempts via enforced protection of government herds and extensive ranching began in 1910 and have continued (with excellent success) to the present day, with some caveats. Extensive farming has increased the bison's population to nearly 150,000, and it is officially no longer considered an endangered species. However, from a genetic standpoint, most of these animals are actually hybrids with domestic cattle and only two populations in Yellowstone National Park, USA and Elk Island National Park, Canada remain as genetically pure bison. These genetically-pure animals account for only ~5% of the currently extant American bison population, reflecting the loss of most of the species' genetic diversity.

As of July 2015, an estimated 4,900 bison lived in Yellowstone National Park, the largest U.S. bison population on public land. During 1983–1985 visitors experienced 33 bison-related injuries (range = 10–13/year), so the park implemented education campaigns. After years of success, five injuries associated with bison encounters occurred in 2015, because visitors did not maintain the required distance of 75 ft (23 m) from bison while hiking or taking pictures.

Nutrition
Bison is an excellent source of complete protein and a rich source (20% or more of the Daily Value, DV) of multiple vitamins, including riboflavin, niacin, vitamin B6, and vitamin B12, and is also a rich source of minerals, including iron, phosphorus, and zinc. Additionally, bison is a good source (10% or more of the DV) of thiamine.

Livestock

The earliest plausible accounts of captive bison are those of the zoo at Tenochtitlan, the Aztec capital, which held an animal the Spaniards called "the Mexican bull". In 1552, Francisco Lopez de Gomara described Plains Indians herding and leading bison like cattle in his controversial book, Historia general de las Indias. Gomara, having never visited the Americas himself, likely misinterpreted early ethnographic accounts as the more familiar pastoralist relationship of the Old World. Today, bison are increasingly raised for meat, hides, wool, and dairy products. The majority of bison in the world are raised for human consumption or fur clothing. Bison meat is generally considered to taste very similar to beef, but is lower in fat and cholesterol, yet higher in protein than beef, which has led to the development of beefalo, a fertile hybrid of bison and domestic cattle. A market even exists for kosher bison meat; these bison are slaughtered at one of the few kosher mammal slaughterhouses in the U.S. and Canada, and the meat is then distributed worldwide.

In America, the commercial industry for bison has been slow to develop despite individuals, such as Ted Turner, who have long marketed bison meat. In the 1990s, Turner found limited success with restaurants for high-quality cuts of meat, which include bison steaks and tenderloin. Lower-quality cuts suitable for hamburger and hot dogs have been described as "almost nonexistent". This created a marketing problem for commercial farming because the majority of usable meat, about 400 pounds for each bison, is suitable for these products. In 2003, the United States Department of Agriculture purchased $10 million worth of frozen overstock to save the industry, which would later recover through better use of consumer marketing. Restaurants have played a role in popularizing bison meat, like Ted's Montana Grill, which added bison to their menus. Ruby Tuesday first offered bison on their menus in 2005.

In Canada, commercial bison farming began in the mid-1980s, concerning an unknown number of animals then. The first census of the bison occurred in 1996, which recorded 45,235 bison on 745 farms, and grew to 195,728 bison on 1,898 farms for the 2006 census.

Several pet food companies use bison as a red meat alternative in dog foods. The companies producing these formulas include Natural Balance Pet Foods, Freshpet, the Blue Buffalo Company, Solid Gold, Canidae, and Taste of the Wild (made by Diamond Pet Foods, Inc., owned by Schell and Kampeter, Inc.).

See also
 Bison hunting
 Gaur
 National Bison Day (1 November in the United States)
 Regina, Saskatchewan: Pile of Bones was the original name for Regina, Saskatchewan in reference to bison bones found nearby.
 Yellowstone Park bison herd

References

Bibliography
 Boyd, Delaney P. (April 2003). Conservation of North American bison: status and recommendations (PDF) (Thesis). University of Calgary, Calgary, AB.   – via Buffalo Field Campaign
 Cunfer, Geoff and Bill Waiser. Bison and People on the North American Great Plains: A Deep Environmental History. College Station, TX: Texas A&M University Press, 2016.

External links

 History of Bison Blend Cattle

 
Holarctic fauna
Mammal genera
Extant Gelasian first appearances
Taxa named by Charles Hamilton Smith